Theodorus Wilhelmus (Theo) Maassen (born 8 December 1966 in Oegstgeest, South Holland) is a Dutch comedian and actor who grew up in the village of Zijtaart (municipality of Veghel) in the Dutch province of North Brabant. He currently lives in Eindhoven. In addition to his shows, he has also made a number of appearances in films.

Career
Maassen won two of the biggest comedy contests in the Netherlands in 1990, the Groninger Studenten Cabaret Festival (GSCF), and Cameretten. The GSCF jury was not pleased with the quality of the contestants that year, and gave Maassen the first prize, remarking he was the best of the year, but still not very good.

Since 1995, Maassens shows are shown on Dutch national television, making him more and more a household name.

In 2006, Maassen received the 'Prins Bernhard Cultuurfonds Theater Prijs 2006' (Prince Bernhard Culture Fund Theatre Prize 2006) for his 'daring combination of theatre and comedy'. The same year he also received the Prijs van de Kritiek (Prize of the critics), a yearly prize by Dutch theatre critics.

He also has released a song titled Lauwe Pis (Lukewarm Piss) which peaked at #1 on the Dutch Top 40.

Shows
 1994: Bepaalde dingen (Certain Things)
 1996: Neuk het systeem (Fuck the System)
 1998: Ruwe pit (Raw Seed)
 2002: Functioneel naakt (Functionally Nude)
 2006: Tegen beter weten in (Against All Odds)
 2009: Zonder pardon (Without Mercy)
 2011: Met alle respect (With All Due Respect)
 2013: Einde oefening (End of Exercise) 
 2016: Vankwaadtoterger (From Bad to Worse)
 2018: Situatie gewijzigd (Altered Situation)
 2022: Onbekend terrein (Unknown Territory)

Films
Maassen played large and small roles in the following Dutch movies:
 2001: AmnesiA as Wouter
 2001: Adriaans plaag (short film) as trader Benedikt
 2001: Undercover Kitty (Minoes) as Tibbe
 2003: www.eenzaam.nl as Marcel
 2003: Interview as Theo
 2003: Kees de jongen as Vader Bakels
 2003: De onterechte kampioen as himself (he also directed and produced this movie)
 2004: Amazones as Achilles
 2006: Black Book (directed by Paul Verhoeven)
 2008: TBS as main character Johan
 2008: Dunya and Desi as Jeff
 2009: Zonder Pardon ("Without Pardon"), registration of the show (see above)
 2010: New Kids Turbo as a drunk in the bar
 2011: The Gang of Oss as Van Schijndel
 2012: Manslaughter (Dutch: Doodslag) as Max
 2012: Fresku 2.0 as himself

Television 
Maassen plays the role of 'Roel' in the television series 'Mevrouw de minister'.  He also had a supporting role in the serie Dunya en Desie.

Personal life 
Maassen once stole the UEFA cup from the stadium of football club PSV Eindhoven.  For several years it was unknown who had been responsible for the disappearance of the trophy. The true story was confessed by Maassen himself, live on a TV talkshow about football.  That night the show had several guests that were in the possession of rare football artifacts.  When the host asked Maassen about his artifact, he took the UEFA cup out of his bag and put it on the table, in front of the baffled host and guests. He received a few hours of community service after being brought up on charges by the team. Later, he also showed on Studio Voetbal that he had stolen PSV's second prize of the UEFA Supercup.

In 2008 Maassen started the organization Comedians for Congo to raise money for children fleeing the war torn country.

See also 
 Culture of the Netherlands

References

External links
 
 

1966 births
Living people
Dutch cabaret performers
Dutch male film actors
Dutch male television actors
Dutch male comedians
Dutch comedy musicians
People from Oegstgeest